Fladbury is a traditional English village located in rural Worcestershire, England.  The village was mentioned in the Domesday Book, almost 1,000 years ago. It  is sited on the banks of the River Avon, with many interesting and original buildings and features. Cropthorne village is on the opposite bank of the Avon. The two ancient communities are linked by the Jubilee Bridge.

History 

A  Beaker settlement was discovered in the centre of Fladbury during excavations into Saxon occupation. Excavations of the Beaker site took place from 1932 to 1941.

Landmarks 
The church of St John the Baptist in Fladbury is located in the village centre. It has been a site of Christian worship since monks settled here in 691AD when Ethelred, King of Mercia, made a grant of land to Oftfor the then Bishop of Worcester. The monks later moved on to found the monastery that became Evesham Abbey. No trace of the early Saxon building remains, and the present building dates from the 12th century, with only the base of the tower dating back to Norman times. The church was rebuilt in 1340 with significant restorations taking place during Victorian times. The tower has a ring of eight bells which were rehung on a new frame in 1991. The famous statesman, Sir John Throckmorton of Throckmorton Manor, Knt., (d. 12 April 1445) was interred in a large altar tomb in Fladbury Church.

Fladbury Mill is a grade II listed building. It dates mainly from the 18th century, and is constructed of brick to an irregular plan.  It has gabled wings; one gabled bay is of earlier timber framing.

Cropthorne Mill is sited on the far side of the river from Fladbury village, on the other side of the weir to Fladbury Village. It is a listed building built in two parts. More recent living accommodation was built probably in the 18th century was added to the much older working original Mill.

Further detailed information is in a book written by a former owner and can be viewed on the external links on this page.

Education 
A voluntary aided Church of England First School provides education  to  around 85 children aged 4 to 10. A September 2007 Ofsted inspection  accorded the school a Grade 2 (good).

Fladbury Walkabout
Fladbury Walkabout is an Open Gardens and Flower Festival, which runs on the first weekend of July each year (1/2 July in 2023). The event normally includes market stalls, live music, classic cars, children's activities, boat trips and refreshments, together with a Fun Run on the Sunday.

John Singer Sargent
The American artist John Singer Sargent, visited Fladbury in 1889. His painting, 'Two Girls with Parasols at Fladbury', is in the Metropolitan Museum of Art in New York.

References

External links

 Fladbury Village Website
 Fladbury CE Aided First School
 Wychavon Local Authority
 Historical Book of Cropthorne Mill, Fladbury and Modern Day Images

Villages in Worcestershire